Lambert Mieszkowic (c. 981 – after 992/95), was a Polish prince of the House of Piast.

He was the fourth son of Mieszko I of Poland, the third born from his second marriage with Oda, daughter of Dietrich of Haldensleben, Margrave of the North March.

Life
Nothing is known about his early years. Lambert's first appearance was in the document called "Dagome iudex" (ca. 991–92), along with his parents and brother Mieszko. After Mieszko I's death (25 May 992), the war began between Bolesław I and his half-brothers for the paternal heritage, a dispute which according to some historians lasted only a few weeks, and according to others, only finished in 995. Despite the tensions between both parties, Bolesław I's first son with Emnilda of Lusatia was probably named after him; it's expected that the choice of this name for his son was an expression of warming relations between Bolesław I and his stepmother Oda.

At the end, Bolesław I took control of the country and expelled his stepmother and half-brothers from Poland to Germany. Lambert's further fate is unknown; previously he was identified with Lambert, Bishop of Kraków (d. 1030), but now this identification is contested.

In 1032, a certain Dytryk (son of either Lambert or his brother Mieszko) returned to Poland and took control of  part of the country after the fall of Mieszko II Lambert, but his reign was short-lived; in 1033, he was deposed and expelled by Mieszko II, who reunited all Poland.

Notes

References
 Thietmari chronicon (edited by Marian Zygmunt Jedlicki), Poznań 1953, p. 224.
 B. Kürbisówna, Dagome iudex – studium krytyczne, [in:] Początki Państwa Polskiego, Poznań 1962, vol. I, p. 396.
 O. Balzer, Genealogia Piastów, Kraków 1895.
 K. Jasiński, Rodowód pierwszych Piastów, Wrocław-Warsaw 1992.
 G. Labuda, Mieszko I, Wrocław 2002, p. 154, 178, 188, 193, 195, 199, 268.
 J. Widajewicz, Początki Polski, Wrocław 1948.

980s births
Year of death unknown
Piast dynasty